Luís Alimbrot (1400s – 1460s), was a Netherlandish painter from Bruges who is known for his work in Spain.

Biography
He was trained to be a painter in Bruges, where he was a member of the Guild of Saint Luke during the years 1432-1437. He later became the father of Joris (or Jordi) Alincbrod, and worked in Valencia, where some works survive.

He died in Valencia between 1460 and 1463.

References

1400s births
1460 deaths
15th-century Spanish painters
Spanish male painters
Early Netherlandish painters
People from Valencia
Painters from Bruges